This is a list of arenas that currently serve as the home venue for NCAA Division I college ice hockey teams. Conference affiliations reflect those in the coming 2022–23 NCAA Division I men's ice hockey and 2022–23 NCAA Division I women's ice hockey seasons.  The arenas serve as home venues for both the men's and women's teams except where noted.  In addition, venues which are not located on campus or are used infrequently during the season have been listed.

Current arenas

Additional arenas

Future arenas
This list includes both arenas under construction and existing venues to be used by programs that are confirmed to be joining Division I hockey in the future.

References

Are
NCAA Division I ice hockey arenas
 
NCAA Division I ice hockey
Ice hockey